Lagomeryx is a genus of prehistoric ungulate that lived in Eurasia from the lower to middle Miocene. Fossil remains were found in Europe and Asia.

Description
This animal looked not very different from present chevrotains, but possessed two small horns on the skull. Its size was very small (Lagomeryx means "rabbit ruminant" in reference to the size). The smallest species, Lagomeryx pumilio, was just as big as a hare. Lagomeryx and his close relatives (such as Ligeromeryx and Stephanocemas) had many primitive features resembling those of moschoid ancestors, such as the presence of two elongated canines in adult males. The cranial appendages were formed by a relatively short pedicle. In smaller species (such as L. pumilio) these horns were very tiny, and did not exceed the height of 1.5 centimeters.

Species
L. colberti
L. complicidens
L. manai Kantapon Suraprasit et al. 2014
L. parvulus
L. pumilio
L. ruetimeyeri Thenius, 1948
L. simpsoni
L. teilhardi 
L. triacuminates
L. tsaidamensis

The type species is L. ruetimeyeri, which could reach the size of a current muntjac, and was found mainly in Germany and France. Other European species are the tiny L. pumilio, and L. parvulus, which was intermediate in size between the two previous ones. Asian species were L. complicidens and L. colberti from China, the latter more specialized and endowed with rather elongated horns. L. manai, found in Thailand, was large and probably related to L. complicidens

See also
 Palaeomeryx

References

External links
Palaeomerycidae at Fossilworks

Further reading
 C.-C. Young. 1964. On a new Lagomeryx from Lantian, Shensi. Vertebrata PalAsiatica 8(4):329-340. DOI: doi.org/10.1080/02724634.2013.789038 
 Gentry, A.W., and E.P.J. Heizmann. 1993. Lagomeryx Roger, 1904 (Mammalia, Artiodactyla): proposed designation of L. ruetimeyeri Thenius, 1948 as the type species. Bulletin of Zoological Nomenclature 50(2): 133–136.
 Gertrud E. Rössner. 2010. Systematics and palaeoecology of Ruminantia (Artiodactyla, Mammalia) from the Miocene of Sandelzhausen (southern Germany, Northern Alpine Foreland Basin). Volume 84, Issue 1, pp 123–162
 Fahlbusch, V. 1977. Die obermiozäne Fossil-Lagerstätte Sandelzhausen 11. Ein neues Zwerghirsch-Geweih: Lagomeryx pumilio? Mitteilungen der Bayerischen Staatssammlung für Paläontologie und historische Geologie 17: 227–233 (German)
 Roger, O. 1904. Wirbeltierreste aus dem Obermiocän der bayerisch-schwäbischen Hochebene. V. Teil. Bericht des Naturwissenschaftlichen Vereins für Schwaben und Neuburg (e.V.) Augsburg 36: 3–22. (German)
 Stehlin, H.G. 1937. Bemerkungen über die miocaenen Hirschgenera Stephanocemas und Lagomeryx. Verhandlungen der Naturforschenden Gesellschaft in Basel 48: 193–214. (German)
 T. Mors, F. Hocht, and B. Wutzler. 2000. Die erst Wirbeltierfauna aus der miozanen Braunkohle der Niederrheinischen Bucht (Ville-Schichten, Tagebau Hambach) [The first vertebrate fauna from the Miocene Ville Series of the Lower Rhine Embayment (Hambach open cast mine, western Germany)]. Paläontologische Zeitschrift 74(1/2): 145-170 (German)

Palaeomerycidae
Miocene even-toed ungulates
Miocene mammals of Asia
Miocene mammals of Europe
Prehistoric even-toed ungulate genera